This is a list of the historic baronies of Northern Ireland.  Baronies were subdivisions of counties, mainly cadastral but with some administrative functions prior to the Local Government (Ireland) Act 1898.

County Antrim
There were 15 baronies in County Antrim:
Antrim Lower
Antrim Upper
Belfast Lower
Belfast Upper
Carrickfergus
Cary
Dunluce Lower
Dunluce Upper
Glenarm Lower
Glenarm Upper
Kilconway
Massereene Lower
Massereene Upper
Toome Lower
Toome Upper

County Armagh
There were 8 baronies in County Armagh:
Armagh
Fews Lower
Fews Upper
Oneilland East
Oneilland West
Orior Lower
Orior Upper
Tiranny or Turaney

County Down
There were 14 baronies in County Down:
Ards Lower
Ards Upper
Castlereagh Lower
Castlereagh Upper
Dufferin
Iveagh Lower, Lower Half
Iveagh Lower, Upper Half
Iveagh Upper, Lower Half
Iveagh Upper, Upper Half
Kinelarty
Lecale Lower
Lecale Upper
Lordship of Newry
Mourne

County Fermanagh
There were 8 baronies in County Fermanagh:
Clanawley
Clankelly
Coole
Knockninny
Lurg
Magheraboy
Magherastephana
Tirkennedy

County Londonderry
There were 6 baronies in County Londonderry:
Coleraine
Keenaght
Loughinsholin
North East Liberties of Coleraine
North-West Liberties of Londonderry
Tirkeeran

County Tyrone
There were 8 baronies in County Tyrone:
Clogher
Dungannon Lower
Dungannon Middle
Dungannon Upper
Omagh East
Omagh West
Strabane Lower
Strabane Upper

See also
List of baronies of Ireland

References

Baronies